Oleka Kelechi Udeala is a Nigerian professor of pharmacy and university administrator. He was the ninth Vice Chancellor of the University of Nigeria, Nsukka and the first head of the faculty of Pharmaceutical Sciences at the University of Port Harcourt.

Early life and education
Udeala was the youngest of five children and grew up in a large extended family. His education was paid for by his elder brother because he failed to win the lottery for a community scholarship. He completed his secondary education with a Cambridge Higher School Certificate in 1960 and started work as a science teacher at his school, then attended the Brooklyn College of Pharmacy at Long Island University in New York on an African Scholarship Programme by American Universities scholarship, returning to Nigeria after graduation in 1966.

Career
Udeala served as Vice Chancellor of the University of Nigeria, Nsukka from 1992 to 1995, the first alumnus of the university to serve in the position. Known as the "unwilling Vice Chancellor", he was removed under the military junta headed by Sani Abacha, when Umaru Gomwalk was appointed chief administrator of the university. He had been appointed until 1999; in 2001 he requested compensation and a declaration that he had been de jure Vice Chancellor for the remainder of his term.

In 2004 he founded the Faculty of Pharmaceutical Sciences at the University of Port Harcourt, where he worked until retiring in 2016.

Honours
Among Udeala's honours was the National Science and Technology Prize in 1990.

References 

Living people
Year of birth missing (living people)
1940s births
Nigerian pharmacists
Academic staff of the University of Port Harcourt
University of Nigeria alumni
Academic staff of the University of Nigeria
Vice-Chancellors of the University of Nigeria